FIFA 2000 (titled FIFA 2000: Major League Soccer in North America) is a football simulation video game developed by EA Canada and published by Electronic Arts. It was the seventh game in the main FIFA series. The game was released for Microsoft Windows and PlayStation. A version was also released for the Game Boy Color, developed by Tiertex Design Studios and published by THQ.

Game features 
Among the innovations for this edition of the series was the ability to play over consecutive seasons, giving the possibility of competing for promotion or relegation and qualification for European Cup competition. The US Major League Soccer was officially licensed for the first time, and was used as a subtitle for the North American release.

Sound 
Commentary in the UK English release is provided by BBC television commentators John Motson, Mark Lawrenson and Chris Waddle. The commentary was recorded in a London studio, however for the first time in the series Motson visited the games developers in Vancouver, Canada to provide insights into the intricacies of the real-life game. The US English release features commentary from Phil Schoen and Julie Foudy from ESPN. Localised commentary exists for the German, Spanish, French, Italian, Hebrew, Japanese, Greek and Brazilian Portuguese releases.

Soundtrack 
The game's theme music was Robbie Williams' "It's Only Us". As part of the agreement to license the track EA Sports included Port Vale, the club Robbie Williams supports, in the game, despite only being in the third tier of the English football league system, which wasn't included as part of this game.

Reception 

The game was met with positive reception, with the exception of the Game Boy Color version, which currently has a score of 47% on GameRankings; the site also gave the PlayStation version 87%, and the PC version 85%. In Japan, where the PlayStation version was ported for release under the name  on 30 March 2000, Famitsu gave it a score of 28 out of 40.

PlayStation Max awarded a gold rating to the PlayStation version, praising its looks, sound and longevity, although they did criticise the ease with which it was possible to score goals. Official UK PlayStation Magazine went further with their criticism of the gameplay, believing the passing to be "too precise" and it being unrealistically easy to beat defenders. They did praise the level of detail in the game's graphics and the commentary and awarded the game a score of 7/10.

In one GamePro review, The Freshman said of the PlayStation version, "EA Sports knows football, both American and otherwise. Soccer fans would have to go a long way to find a better soccer sim on the PlayStation. Lace up those cleats and go for the goal!" Air Hendrix said of the same PlayStation version, "If you're into soccer, FIFA ranks as an automatic purchase. Plus, sports fans in general will find that–despite the game's minor flaws–FIFAs polished performance makes for exciting, rewarding fun that'll glue you to the screen." Nash Werner said that the PC version "has what I've always wanted: good single-player AI and the MLS. But players that look like cartoons, the absence of key offensive plays and jukes, and limited MLS playability, offset these additions. In the end, I like FIFA 99 better."

By 2000, it had sold 500,000 units. The PlayStation version received a "Platinum" sales award from the Entertainment and Leisure Software Publishers Association (ELSPA), indicating sales of at least 300,000 units in the UK.

The PC version won the Academy of Interactive Arts & Sciences' 1999 "Sports Game of the Year" award.

Notes

References

External links 

1999 video games
Electronic Arts games
EA Sports games
Association football video games
2
Game Boy Color games
PlayStation (console) games
THQ games
Tiertex Design Studios games
Video games developed in Canada
Windows games
Video games scored by Rom Di Prisco
Video games set in 1999
Video games set in 2000
D.I.C.E. Award for Sports Game of the Year winners
Multiplayer and single-player video games